"Lookin' at Me" is the third and final single released from Mase's debut album, Harlem World. The song was produced by The Neptunes and featured Puff Daddy. The single was yet another success for Mase, becoming his third consecutive top 10 hit, peaking at #8 on the Billboard Hot 100, and was certified gold on August 17, 1998. The song was paired with "24 Hrs. to Live", which featured Black Rob, DMX and The LOX.

Along with Noreaga's "Superthug", the song was one of the first high-profile productions by Virginia production team The Neptunes, who would later go on to become one of the most successful production teams in music history.

Promotional music videos were released for both "Lookin' at Me" and "24 Hrs. to Live."

Kanye West's 2012 song "Cold" uses some of the lyrics from "Lookin' at Me"

Single track listing

A-side
"Lookin' at Me" – 4:21  
"24 Hrs. to Live" – 4:25 (featuring Black Rob, DMX and The LOX)  
"Wanna Hurt Mase?" – 4:25

B-side
"Lookin' at Me" (Instrumental) – 5:04  
"24 Hrs. to Live" (Instrumental) – 4:36

Charts and certifications

Weekly charts

Year-end charts

Certifications

|}

References

1997 songs
1998 singles
Bad Boy Records singles
Mase songs
Sean Combs songs
Song recordings produced by the Neptunes
Music videos directed by McG
Songs written by Chad Hugo
Songs written by Pharrell Williams
Songs written by Sean Combs
Songs written by Mase